The Norcross Wildlife Sanctuary is a wildlife refuge in Monson, Massachusetts.  Founded by Arthur Norcross in 1939, the 8,000 acre wildlife refuge was established to preserve, protect and propagate native flora and fauna.  The refuge is part of the Norcross Wildlife Foundation, which awards loans and grants, and has helped preserve over 33,000 acres since 1939.

Natural history
Much of the refuge is part of the Quinebaug Highlands, which in turn is part of the Eastern New England Uplift.

Trails and recreation
The sanctuary has 2.5 miles of trails.  The refuge offers programs throughout the year.

References

External links
 Norcross Wildlife Sanctuary - official site

Massachusetts
Nature reserves in Massachusetts
Nature centers in Massachusetts
Protected areas established in 1939
1939 establishments in Massachusetts